Renal reabsorption of chloride (Cl−) is a part of renal physiology, in order not to lose too much chloride in the urine.

Overview table

References

Renal physiology